Tahj Dayton Mowry (born May 17, 1986) is an American actor and singer. He is the brother of identical twin actresses Tia Mowry and Tamera Mowry and is known for his role on the show Smart Guy as the main character TJ on The WB, though the show gained later recognition on Disney Channel. Mowry was later cast as the voice of ten-year-old super genius Wade Load on Kim Possible as a nod to this role. He is also known for his roles as Michelle's best friend Teddy on Full House and Tucker Dobbs on Freeform's comedy show Baby Daddy.

Early life
Tahj Dayton Mowry was born in Honolulu, Hawaii, on May 17, 1986. His mother, Darlene Renée (née Flowers), managed her children's careers. His father, Timothy John Mowry, was in the U.S. Army and later became a custody officer/jailer with the City of Glendale Police Department when the family moved to California.

His father has English and Irish ancestry, and his mother is of Afro-Bahamian descent. His parents met in high school in Miami, Florida. Both joined the U.S. Army, and both eventually reached the rank of Sergeant. His older twin sisters are Tia and Tamera Mowry and he also has a brother named Tavior. He played varsity football at Westlake High School in Thousand Oaks, California, and one season of football at Savannah State University and the University of Wyoming. He attended Pepperdine University in Malibu, California, where his sisters Tia and Tamera both graduated.

Career
Mowry starred and is perhaps best known as T.J. Henderson, a child prodigy, on the sitcom Smart Guy. He played Teddy on the sitcom Full House. He also appeared in Disney Channel movies such as Hounded and The Poof Point. He had a guest role on the Disney Channel Original Series, The Suite Life of Zack & Cody and in a Star Trek: Voyager episode entitled "Innocence". Mowry appeared in the movie Are We Done Yet? as Danny Pulu and in Seventeen Again as Willie Donovan. Mowry also had an appearance in one episode in the fourth season of Desperate Housewives. He also made a guest appearance on an episode of The Game as Melanie Barnett's brother (he's also the real brother of Melanie's portrayer Tia Mowry). Mowry performed the voice of Wade in the Disney Channel animated series Kim Possible.

Mowry sang "Shine Your Light On Me" for School's Out! Christmas, Circle of Life for the Disney Channel Circle of Stars recording of The Lion King which was included on the Platinum Edition DVD and was featured on a single called "Kick It Out" with Boom Boom Satellites and Flo Rida. He also appeared in an episode of Friends when Phoebe sings for kindergarten kids.

He also starred as Tucker Dobbs in the ABC Family sitcom Baby Daddy. The half-hour sitcom premiered on June 20, 2012. Mowry released his debut single called "Flirt" produced by Excel Beats in April 2015. He released a six-song EP entitled, Future Funk, on August 4, 2015. The EP included "Bossy", "Dancing Alone" and "End of the Road" as stand out tracks.

Mowry appeared on the daytime talk show The Real with his sister and co-host Tamera Mowry and as a guest co-host for three episodes.

Mowry will star in the upcoming Disney+ series The Muppets Mayhem.

Personal life
Mowry dated actress Naya Rivera between 2000 and 2004, after working together on Smart Guy in the 1990s. Rivera remained close with Tahj and his sisters, Tia and Tamera, until her death, including helping the sisters find an apartment when they got kicked out of their house.

On July 12, 2020, Mowry posted an Instagram tribute to Rivera, while search operations were underway for her after she went missing while swimming on July 8 at Lake Piru in Southern California. Rivera was subsequently found the day after and pronounced dead.

Filmography

Film

Television

Awards

References

External links
 
 TahjDMowry at YouTube
 the TahjMowry blog at Tumblr

1986 births
Male actors from Hawaii
20th-century American male actors
21st-century American male actors
African-American male actors
American male child actors
African-American male dancers
African-American dancers
African-American Christians
American male dancers
American male film actors
American male television actors
American male voice actors
American people of Bahamian descent
American people of English descent
Pepperdine University alumni
Living people
Male actors from Honolulu
Dancers from Hawaii
20th-century African-American people
21st-century African-American people